Broadland is a Norfolk constituency, which has been represented in parliament since the 2019 general election by Jerome Mayhew, a Conservative.

History
The Boundary Commission for England created the Broadland constituency as the successor seat to Mid Norfolk, which was relocated. It comprised the majority of Mid Norfolk, together with parts of North Norfolk and Norwich North. The name is taken from the local government area Broadland though its boundary does not match that of the district council nor is it coterminous with the Norfolk Broads (waterways and surrounding protected land).

Boundaries

The District of Broadland wards of Acle, Aylsham, Blofield with South Walsham, Brundall, Burlingham, Buxton, Coltishall, Drayton North, Drayton South, Eynesford, Great Witchingham, Hevingham, Horsford and Felthorpe, Marshes, Plumstead, Reepham, Spixworth with St Faiths, Taverham North, Taverham South, and Wroxham, and the District of North Norfolk wards of Astley, Lancaster North, Lancaster South, The Raynhams, Walsingham, and Wensum.

The new seat includes the District of Broadland wards which had previously comprised a majority of the Mid Norfolk constituency, as well as Drayton and Taverham, transferred back from Norwich North.  The six District of North Norfolk wards, including the town of Fakenham, were transferred from the constituency of North Norfolk.

The constituency stretches from near Great Yarmouth in the east to the north west of the county.  Among attractions within the seat's boundaries are the steam and fairground collection at Thursford and the Anglican shrine at Walsingham; both were in the North Norfolk constituency until 2010.

Members of Parliament

Elections

Elections in the 2010s

* ''Served in the 2005–2010 Parliament as MP for Mid Norfolk

See also
List of parliamentary constituencies in Norfolk

Notes

References

External links 
nomis Constituency Profile for Broadland — presenting data from the ONS annual population survey and other official statistics.

Parliamentary constituencies in Norfolk
Constituencies of the Parliament of the United Kingdom established in 2010
Broadland